Wencho Farrell (born 25 December 1982) is an international footballer from the Netherlands Antilles who plays amateur club football with HCSC.

Club career
Farrell began his career in 2002 with HCSC, and has also had a season-long spell with Türkiyemspor.

External links

Caribbean Football Database

References

1982 births
Living people
Dutch Antillean footballers
Netherlands Antilles international footballers
Curaçao footballers
Curaçao international footballers
FC Türkiyemspor players
Dual internationalists (football)
Association football goalkeepers